The UEFA Euro 2016 qualifying Group F was one of the nine groups to decide which teams would qualify for the UEFA Euro 2016 finals tournament. Group F consisted of six teams: Greece, Hungary, Romania, Finland, Northern Ireland, and Faroe Islands, where they played against each other home-and-away in a round-robin format.

The top two teams, Northern Ireland and Romania, qualified directly for the finals. As third-placed Hungary were not the highest-ranked among all third-placed teams, they advanced to the play-offs, where they won against Norway and thus qualified as well.

Standings

Matches 

The fixtures were released by UEFA the same day as the draw, which was held on 23 February 2014 in Nice. Times are CET/CEST, as listed by UEFA (local times are in parentheses).

Goalscorers

Discipline 
A player was automatically suspended for the next match for the following offences:
 Receiving a red card (red card suspensions could be extended for serious offences)
 Receiving three yellow cards in three different matches, as well as after fifth and any subsequent yellow card (yellow card suspensions were carried forward to the play-offs, but not the finals or any other future international matches)
The following suspensions were served during the qualifying matches:

Notes

References

External links 
UEFA Euro 2016 qualifying round Group F

Group F
2014–15 in Northern Ireland association football
Q
2014–15 in Greek football
2015–16 in Greek football
2014–15 in Hungarian football
Q
2014–15 in Romanian football
Q
2014 in Finnish football
2015 in Finnish football
2014 in Faroe Islands football
2015 in Faroe Islands football